Antonin may refer to:

People 
 Antonin (name)

Places 
Poland
 Antonin, Jarocin County, Greater Poland Voivodeship
 Antonin, Kalisz County, Greater Poland Voivodeship
 Antonin, Oborniki County, Greater Poland Voivodeship
 Antonin, Ostrów Wielkopolski County, Greater Poland Voivodeship
 Antonin, Poznań County, Greater Poland Voivodeship
 Antonin, Środa Wielkopolska County, Greater Poland Voivodeship
 Antonin, Sieradz County, Łódź Voivodeship
 Antonin, Zduńska Wola County, Łódź Voivodeship
 Antonin, Masovian Voivodeship
 Antonin, Podlaskie Voivodeship
 Antonin, Pomeranian Voivodeship
 Antonin, part of Nowe Miasto, Poznań, Greater Poland Voivodeship

See also

Antolin (name)
Antonina (disambiguation)
Antonini (disambiguation)
Antonino (disambiguation)
Antoniny (disambiguation)
Antoninus (disambiguation)
Antoniu
Antonen